Cyclocross Gullegem, officially the Hexia cyclocross Gullegem, is a cyclo-cross race that has been organized annually since 2018 in Gullegem, Belgium.

Winners

Men

Women

References

External links

Cycle races in Belgium
Cyclo-cross races
Recurring sporting events established in 2018
2018 establishments in Belgium
Sport in West Flanders